Muradym (Moraźım) is a rural locality (a village) in Yuldybayevsky Selsoviet, Kugarchinsky District, Bashkortostan, Russia. The population was 165 as of 2010. There are 2 streets.

Geography 
Muradym is located 24 km southeast of Mrakovo (the district's administrative centre) by road. Bagdashkino is the nearest rural locality.

References 

Rural localities in Kugarchinsky District